The 2021 Holland Ladies Tour, also known as the 2021 Simac Ladies Tour is a road cycling stage race that took place in the Netherlands between 24 and 29 August 2021. It was the 23rd edition of the Holland Ladies Tour, and part of the 2021 UCI Women's World Tour.

Teams 
All nine UCI Women's WorldTeams and seven UCI Women's Continental Teams made up the sixteen teams that participated the race.

UCI Women's WorldTeams

 
 
 
 
 
 
 
 
 

UCI Women's Continental Teams

Route

Stages

Prologue 
24 August 2021 – Ede to Ede,

Stage 1 
25 August 2021 – Zwolle to Hardenberg,

Stage 2
26 August 2021 – Gennep to Gennep,

Stage 3
27 August 2021 – Stramproy to Weert,

Stage 4
28 August 2021 – Geleen to Sweikhuizen,

Stage 5
29 August 2021 – Arnhem to Arnhem,

Classification leadership table

References

External links 
 

Holland Ladies Tour
Holland Ladies Tour
Holland Ladies Tour